Shinnosuke (written: , , , , , , , ,  or ) is a masculine Japanese given name. Notable people with the name include:

, Japanese baseball player
, Japanese voice actor
, Japanese footballer
, Japanese footballer
, a stage name taken on by a series of Kabuki actors of the Ichikawa family
, Japanese rugby union player
, Japanese rakugoka
, Japanese actor
, Japanese footballer
, the first Shinbashira of Tenrikyo
, Japanese baseball player
, Japanese baseball player
, Japanese voice actor
, Japanese handball player
, Japanese squash player

Japanese masculine given names